The Battle of Chatra was a conflict that took place during the Indian Rebellion of 1857 between the East India Company and the mutinying sepoys who were allied certain local zamindars. The rebels had amassed a force of 3000 men and had taken the town of Chatra which is located in the Chhota Nagpur region.

Background
Two companies of the Ramgarh Battalion which were stationed in Hazaribagh revolted against the British authorities as did other troops all across North India such as in Meerut. These sepoys fell under the leadership of local rebel leaders including Jaimangal Pandey and Thakur Vishwanath Shahdeo and formed a mukti vahini (people's army) and intended to overthrow the British authorities. The rebel force was planning to travel northwards to Rohtas were they would combine their forces with the rebel leader of North Bihar, Kunwar Singh.

Battle
The various British forces were sent in pursuit of the rebels as they traveled northwards through Hazaribagh until they also reached Chatra. The rebels received word that a clash was inevitable and fortified themselves within the town and in the process were harassing, robbing and looting the local people which caused many of them to assist the British forces. This plunderous behaviour also left the rebels open to a sudden attack.

Major Smith drew a rough plan of the town and decided to attack from the South. The advanced guard located the main body of rebels and immediately a skirmish took place in the rice fields. 
As this progressed, various skirmishes also started to place throughout the town with both sides suffering heavy losses. In the end, the British forces started to attack the town from all flanks. The British took advantage of heavy tree cover on the outskirts of the town else they likely would have suffered even heavier losses. Two rebel leaders, Jai Mangal Pandey and Nadir Ali were captured and quickly hanged.

Aftermath
Two of the major rebel leaders, Vishwanath Shahdeo and Ganpat Rai managed to escape and continued to harass the British forces before being captured in 1858 and hanged.

References

1857 in India
19th-century military history of the United Kingdom
Chatra